L'Armida immaginaria is a dramma giocoso in three acts by composer Domenico Cimarosa with an Italian libretto by Giuseppe Palomba. The opera was first performed in Naples during the summer of 1777 at the Teatro di Fiorentini.

Roles

Other operas named after the sorceress Armida
Armida (Dvořák)
Armida (Haydn)
Armida (Rossini)
Armida (Sacchini)
Armida (Salieri)
Armida (Weir)
Armida abbandonata
Armida al campo d'Egitto
Armide (Gluck)
Armide (Lully)

References 

1777 operas
Italian-language operas
Drammi giocosi
Operas by Domenico Cimarosa
Operas